William R. Rockhill (February 10, 1793 – January 15, 1865) was an American politician who served one term as a U.S. Representative from Indiana from 1847 to 1849.

Biography 
Born in Burlington, New Jersey, Rockhill attended the public schools.
He moved to Fort Wayne, Indiana, in 1823.
He engaged in agricultural pursuits.

Political career 
He served as commissioner of Allen County, Indiana, in 1825 Justice of the Peace.
He served as member of the first city council of Fort Wayne and also city assessor.
He served as member of the State house of representatives 1834-1837.
He served in the State senate 1844-1847.

Rockhill was elected as a Democrat to the Thirtieth Congress (March 4, 1847 – March 3, 1849).
He resumed agricultural pursuits.

Family 
He was first married to Theodosia Richardson (1797–1833). Their daughter, Elizabeth (1816–1889), married Isaac DeGroff Nelson (1810–1891), and they were the parents of the famous Kansas City newspaper baron, William Rockhill Nelson (1841–1915). William Rockhill second marriage was to Elizabeth Hill (1820–1859) on September 29, 1848.

Death 
Rockhill died at Fort Wayne on January 15, 1865. He was interred in Lindenwood Cemetery.

References

External links 
 

1793 births
1865 deaths
County commissioners in Indiana
People from Burlington, New Jersey
Democratic Party Indiana state senators
Democratic Party members of the Indiana House of Representatives
Democratic Party members of the United States House of Representatives from Indiana
19th-century American politicians